Gurgaon, officially named Gurugram , is a planned city and administrative headquarters of Gurugram District, located in the northern Indian state of Haryana. It is one of the major satellite cities of Delhi and is part of the National Capital Region of India. , Gurgaon had a population of 1,153,000.

Gurgaon is India's second largest information technology hub and third largest financial and banking hub. Gurgaon is also home to India's largest medical tourism industry. Despite being India's 56th largest city in terms of population, Gurgaon is the 8th largest city in the country in terms of total wealth. Gurgaon serves as the headquarters of many of India's largest companies, is home to thousands of startup companies and has local offices for more than 250 Fortune 500 companies. It accounts for almost 70% of the total annual economic investments in Haryana state, which has helped it become a leading hub for high-tech industry in northern India. Gurgaon is categorised as very high on the Human Development Index, with an HDI of 0.889 (2017).

Gurgaon's economic growth started in the 1970s when Maruti Suzuki India Limited established a manufacturing plant and gathered pace after General Electric established its business outsourcing operations in the city in collaboration with real-estate firm DLF. New Gurgaon, Manesar and Sohna serve as adjoining manufacturing and upcoming real estate hubs for Gurgaon. Despite rapid economic and population growth, Gurgaon continues to battle socio-economic issues, such as high-income inequality and high air pollution. It also has a flood problem due to the limited drainage capacity.

History

The region of Gurgaon originally fell under the Kuru Kingdom. Early people to inhabit the region were Hindus ruled over by the Ahir clan. Yadu tribes were a part of this clan and today their descendants commonly hold the last name Yadav. In late 4th century BCE, the city was absorbed by the Maurya Empire as part of Chandragupta Maurya's earliest expansions of his kingdom.

Gurgaon may be same as the Gudapura town mentioned in the 12th century text Prithviraja Vijaya. According to the text, Nagarjuna, a cousin of the Chahamana king Prithviraj Chauhan, rebelled against the king and captured the town. Prithviraj crushed the rebellion and recaptured the town.

During the Mughal and initially during the British colonial era, Gurgaon was just a small village in Jharsa paragana of Delhi subah. Report of a Tour in Eastern Rajputana in 1882–83 (published in 1885) by Alexander Cunningham, the then Director-General of Archaeological Survey of India, he mentions a stone pillar at Gurgaon of a local feudal lord "Durgga Naga" with a 3-line inscription "Samvat 729 or 928, Vaisakh badi 4, Durgga Naga lokatari bhuta" dating back to 672 AD or 871 AD. Jharsa paragana passed to Begum Samru in 1776–77 and came under direct British rule in 1836 after her death when her territory was taken over by the British who established a civil lines at Jharsa and a cavalry cantonment at nearby Hiyadatpur. A 1882 land revenue settlement report records that the idol of Sitla Mata was brought to Gurgaon 400 years earlier (15th century). Begum Samru claimed the offering to Sitla Mata temple during the Chaitra month and the revenue from the offerings given to the deity for rest of the month was distributed among the prominent Jat zamindars of the area. In 1818, Bharawas district was disbanded and Gurgaon was made a new district. In 1821, the Bharaswas cantonment was also moved to Hidayatpur in Gurgaon. "Aliwardi mosque" in Gurgaon, "Badshahpur baoli" (1905). and "Bhondsi" (16th to 17th century) were built during mughal and British era. The "Church of the Epiphany" and "Kaman Serai" (Corrupted form of the "Command Serai" or Officer's Mess") was built by the Britishers in 1925 inside the civil lines.

Other British colonial era historic buildings The Gurgaon Club, a 3-room building surrounded by the lawn and currently run by the Zila Parishad, the erstwhile Coronation School—now renamed to the Government Boys’ Senior Secondary School, one of the 13 school established in India in 1911 to commemorate the coronation of King George V. During 1980s, the airstrip and hangar, air conditioned yoga ashram and TV studio were built on outskirts of the city by former Prime Minister Indira Gandhi's yoga mentor Dhirendra Brahmachari. The former Prime Minister Chandra Shekhar established his own ashram near this airstrip in 1983 on 600 acre of panchayat land, where another godman Chandraswami and notorious Saudi arms dealer Adnan Khashoggi used to visit him.

On 12 April 2016, Chief Minister of Haryana Manohar Lal Khattar announced a proposal to officially rename the city Gurugram (Sanskrit: गुरुग्राम, lit. village of the Guru), subject to the approval of the Haryana cabinet and the Union Government. He argued that the new name would help to preserve the "rich heritage" of the city by emphasising its history and mythological association with Drona. On 27 September 2016, he officially announced that the Union Government had approved the name change, and thus the city and district would henceforth be known as Gurugram, though the old name "Gurgaon" still lingers in the colloquial usage.

Geography
Gurgaon is located in Gurgaon district in the Indian state of Haryana and is situated in the southeastern part of the state, and northern part of the country. The city is located on the border with Delhi with New Delhi to its northeast.

Topography

Ecology
Gurgaon lies on the Sahibi River, a tributary of Yamuna which originates from the Aravalli range in Rajasthan and flows through west and South Haryana into Delhi where it is also known as the Najafgarh drain. The paleochannel and the current course of the Sahibi river have series of biodiversity hotspots and Important Bird Area (IBA) wetlands and forests within Gurugam, including the Outfall Drain Number 6 (canalised portion in Haryana of Sahibi river), Outfall Drain Number 8 (canalised portion in Haryana of Dohan river which is a tributary of Sahibi river), Sarbashirpur wetland, Sultanpur National Park, Basai wetland, Najafgarh lake and Najafgarh drain bird sanctuary, Ghata lake, Badshahpur lake, Khandsa lake and The Lost lake of Gurgaon. Other IBA wetlands along the Saibi river, outside Gurgaon district, are the Masani barrage wetland, Matanhail forest, Chhuchhakwas-Godhari, Khaparwas Wildlife Sanctuary, Bhindawas Wildlife Sanctuary, etc. All of these are home to endangered and migratory birds. Most of these largely remain unprotected. These are under extreme threat mainly from the colonisers and builders.

Mangar Bani, a sacred grove and forest with wetlands between Gurgaon and Faridabad, is one of the last surviving natural forest in NCR is protected by Gurjars of nearby area. contiguous to Mangar bani are Gwal Pahari and Bandhwari forested area. All of these lie on the Southern Delhi Ridge of Aravalli range.

Climate
Under the Köppen climate classification, Gurgaon experiences a hot semi-arid climate (BSh). The city experiences four distinct seasons – spring (February–March), summer (April–August), autumn (October–November) and winter (December–January) – along with the monsoon season (June–September) setting in towards the latter half of the summer. The season experiences heat indices easily breaking . Winters are cool and foggy with few sunny days. The Western Disturbance brings some rain in winters that further adds to the chill. Spring and autumn are mild and pleasant seasons with low humidity. The monsoon season usually starts in the first week of July and continues till August. Thunderstorms are not uncommon during the Monsoon.

Demographics
The Gurugram district area has an estimated population of 11,53,000, according to the 2011 Census of India.

Religion

Hinduism is the most popular religion in Gurgaon, followed by Islam, and Sikhism. There are small numbers of Christian, and Buddhist followers. Gurgaon has adherents of Hinduism, Sikhism, Islam, Buddhism, Jainism, Christianity and the Baháʼí Faith, amongst others. There are several places of worship for major religions, including mandirs, gurdwaras, mosques and churches.

Sheetla Mata Mandir, located at the heart of Gurgaon, is a temple dedicated to the wife of Guru Dronacharya, Kripi. The temple hosts fairs and people come to seek blessings of Sheetla Mata, earlier known as Kripi.
Sai Ka Aangan temple, spread over an area of 36,000 square feet, is dedicated to Shirdi Sai Baba & has life size idol of him.

Cityscape

Architecture

Gurgaon has architecturally noteworthy buildings in a wide range of styles and from distinct time periods. Gurgaon's skyline with its many skyscrapers is nationally recognised, and the city has been home to several tall buildings with modern planning. Gurgaon has an estimated 1,892 high-rises. The average cost of a  two-bedroom apartment at a decent condominium in Gurgaon is at least $160,130 (₹ One crore).

Neighbourhoods

Gurgaon is divided into 36 wards, with each ward further divided into blocks. The housing type in the city consists largely of attached housing, though many attached multi-dwelling units, including apartments, condominiums and high rise residential towers are getting popular.

Parks
Gurgaon has a complex park system, with various lands operated by the Gurgaon Metropolitan Development Authority. There are local parks in almost all sectors in Old Gurgaon.

Culture

Entertainment and performing arts

Notable performing art venues in the city include Epicentre in Sector 44 and Nautanki Mehal at the Kingdom of Dreams near IFFCO Chowk. Bollywood actor Rajkummar Rao was born in Gurgaon.

Languages and dialect
The main language spoken in Gurgaon is Hindi, though a segment of the population understands and speaks English. The dialect used in Hindi is similar to that of Delhi, and is considered neutral, though the regional influences from the states of Haryana, Uttar Pradesh and Punjab adds an accent to the language. English is spoken with an Indian accent, with a primarily North Indian influence. Since Gurgaon has many international call centres, the employees are usually given formal training in neutral pronunciation in order to be understandable to native English speakers. Haryanvi and Punjabi are other popular languages spoken in the city.

Religion
Gurgaon has adherents of Hinduism, Sikhism, Islam, Buddhism, Jainism, Christianity and the Baháʼí Faith, amongst others. There are several places of worship for major religions, including mandirs, gurdwaras, mosques and churches.

Sheetla Mata Mandir, located at the heart of Gurgaon, is a temple dedicated to the wife of Guru Dronacharya, Kripi. The temple hosts fairs and people come to seek blessings of Sheetla Mata, earlier known as Kripi.
Sai Ka Aangan temple, spread over an area of 36,000 square feet, is dedicated to Shirdi Sai Baba & has a life size idol of him.

Sports
The city has two major sports stadiums: Tau Devi Lal Stadium in Sector 38, which has facilities for cricket, football, basketball and athletics as well as a sports hostel, and Nehru Stadium which is designed for football and athletics. Amity United FC is a tenant of Tau Devi Lal Stadium. Gurgaon district has nine golf courses, and is described as the "heart of India's golfing country". Joginder Rao, a domestic cricket player was from Gurgaon.

Economy

Gurgaon has the third-highest per-capita income in India and is the site of Indian offices for half of Fortune 500 companies. The city also benefits from its close proximity to Delhi. Maruti Suzuki Private Limited was the first company that set up a manufacturing unit in the city in 1970s making cars. Eventually, DLF Limited, a real estate company acquired vast stretches of land in the city. The first major American brand to set up a unit in Gurgaon was General Electric in 1997. General Electric's setup in Gurgaon prompted other companies, both international as well as domestic, to follow suit providing outsourcing solutions in software, IT, service and sales through delivery facilities and call centres. However, due to the lack of proper public transport and the inability of most of the employees to afford a personal vehicle, most of the call centres provide pooled-in cars to and from their offices. Apart from Business process outsourcing and IT sectors, the city is home to several other companies that specialise in domain expertise. Siemens Industry Software, in Gurgaon Business Park, made a portfolio of design software that was used by NASA to digitally design, simulate and assemble the vehicle before any physical prototypes were built. Various international companies, including Coca-Cola, Pepsi, BMW, Agilent Technologies, Hyundai have chosen Gurgaon to be their Indian corporate headquarters. All the major companies in the city depend on their own backup, given the fact that Gurgaon does not have reliable power and water supply, public transport and utilities. Retail is an important industry in Gurgaon, with the presence of 26 shopping malls.

All Nippon Airways, a Japanese airline, maintains its Delhi sales office in the Time Tower in Gurgaon .

Law and government
Gurgaon is governed by the Municipal Corporation of Gurugram which follows a Mayor-Council system. In 2017, the GMDA (Gurugram Metropolitan Development Authority) was formed, which looks after the city's infrastructure.

Crime
As per the authorities, the following is the crime data of Gurgaon for 2022:

The police department in Gurgaon is headed by the Commissioner of Police - Gurugram Police, which forms a part of the Haryana Police. and reports to the Haryana state government. Gurugram Police has a separate traffic police department headquartered in sector 51. Fire protection within the city limits is provided by Municipal Corporation of Gurugram through four fire stations, located in sector 29, sector 37, Udyog Vihar and Bhim Nagar.

In 2018, the first cyber police station was inaugurated in the city. As per the authorities, around 1,500 complaints related to cyber crime, including cyber fraud, online banking fraud, cheating through bank cards, social media complaints & data theft, are received every month. Due to shortage of in-house cyber experts, the police largely outsources such cases to external organizations.

Education 

The city's public school system is managed by the government of Haryana and administered by Haryana Board of School Education. There are other schools affiliated to the Central Board of Secondary Education, Indian Certificate of Secondary Education and International Baccalaureate boards. Key schools in the city include Alpine Convent School, Blue Bells Model School, Gurugram Public School, Heritage Xperiential Learning School, Lancers International School, Ryan International School, MatriKiran, SCR Public School, Shalom Hills International School, The Shri Ram School and Vega Schools.

There are several universities and institutes, offering bachelor's, master's, doctorate and other programs, located in Gurgaon and the surrounding area, including Gurugram University, Sushant University, Sushant School of Art and Architecture, Ansal University, The NorthCap University, GD Goenka University, K.R. Mangalam University, Amity University, Management Development Institute, Great Lakes Institute of Management, Infinity Business School, BML Munjal University, Shree Guru Gobind Singh Tricentenary University, and National Brain Research Centre.

Transport

Roadways 

The major highway that links Gurgaon is National Highway 48, the road that runs from Delhi to Mumbai. While the  Delhi-Gurgaon border-Kherki Dhaula stretch has been developed as the Delhi–Gurgaon Expressway, the rest is expanded to six lanes.

Railways

Intercity rail 
Gurgaon railway station is operated by Northern Railway of Indian Railways. The rail station forms a part of the larger Indian Railways network. Along with that, Gurgaon has Tajnagar railway station, Dhankot railway station, Ghari Harsaru Railway Junction and Farrukhnagar Railway Station, Patli Railway Station. Under Modernisation of Railway Stations, Indian Railways is modernising four railway stations in Gurgaon. Gurgaon railway station, Ghari Harsaru Railway Junction and Farrukhnagar Railway Station will be developed and modernised with modern amenities and international facilities.

Delhi Metro 

There are five stations served by Delhi Metro Rail Corporation Ltd. located on the Yellow Line, which are HUDA City Centre, IFFCO Chowk, MG Road, Sikanderpur and Guru Droncharya.

Rapid Metro
The Rapid Metro has eleven stations in Gurgaon, with an interchange with Yellow Line of Delhi Metro at Sikanderpur metro station. One more phase of the project is in the pipeline and would take the total number of subway stations in the city to 16. An estimated 33,000 people ride the Rapid Metro every day, which provides an exclusive elevated transit service with three coach trains that run in a loop.

Airways

Airport 
Gurgaon is served by Delhi's Indira Gandhi International Airport, which is located just outside of Gurgaon city limits near National Highway 8.

Transit systems

Public transit 
In November 2013, Gurgaon launched an Ciclovia-inspired initiative known as Raahgiri Day—in which a corridor of streets are closed to motor vehicle traffic on Sunday mornings to encourage the use of non-motorized transport and participation in outdoor leisure activities. Gurgaon was the first city in India to implement such a program, followed by New Delhi, and later Noida.

Gurgaon is also expected to get India's first Pod Taxis.

Utilities 
Electricity in Gurgaon is provided by government-owned Dakshin Haryana Bijli Vitran Nigam. Gurgaon has power consumer base of 360,000 with average power load of 700-800 MW. There are frequent power outages in the city, especially during the peak consumption season of summer. Apart from the power deficit, the equipment used by the power department like transformers, panels and transmission lines is either old or overburdened.

Issues

Flooding 
Gurgaon is notorious for its urban floods every monsoon. The areas on NH-8 around Hero Honda Chowk, Basai, Dhankot, sector 37 etc. see massive urban floods and headlines grabbing traffic jams reported widely in news media.  A recent research report puts the blame on the broken natural water body linkage and obstructions in the flow in the city due to frantic construction during the last decades. The HUDA master drainage lines get choked or burst at the seams. Disruptions in the hydrological flow of natural drains and limited drainage capacity are all primary reasons for the floods.

Gurgaon's Ghata Jheel, Badshahpur Jheel, Khandsa Talab were linked to Najafgarh drain which links to Yamuna river, via natural water channels and drains.

As per the ground reports and research, the three natural water bodies are struggling for their existence with encroachments on their lands and natural channels. Agencies responsible have tried to create artificial water bodies to compensate,  but the efforts fail due to unpredictable rain and water flow patterns leading to deployment of water pumps to fight the situation.

In 2012 Punjab & Haryana High court banned ground water usage for construction activity, and NGT has recently reprimanded authorities for drain concretization.

See also
 National Capital Region
 New Gurgaon

References 

Sector 63 Gurgaon

Further reading

External links 
 
 

 
Cities and towns in Gurgaon district
High-technology business districts in India
Satellite cities
Satellite Cities in India
Medical tourism
Haryana
Haryana-related lists